Duplicate Tsing Yi South Bridge or Duplicate Tsing Yi Bridge or Kwai Tsing Bridge is a 640-metre long bridge connecting Tsing Yi Island and Kwai Chung over the Rambler Channel of Hong Kong in parallel to Tsing Yi Bridge, which deteriorated owing to years of heavy usage. The duplicated bridge was built to relieve the overburdened Tsing Yi Bridge and opened on 26 July 1999 before the commencement of Tsing Yi Bridge renovation. This is the fourth vehicular bridge connecting Kwai Chung and Tsing Yi.

The duplicated bridge piers are aligned with those of Tsing Yi Bridge to retain the navigation channel. Two artificial islands with lights are created to protect the bridges against accidental damage by ships, which happened to the Tsing Yi Bridge several times.

The connecting roads and ramps are restructured on both the Tsing Yi Island side and the Kwai Chung side. These improvements have freed the bridges from traffic congestion, which occurred frequently in the past.

References

Tsing Yi
Bridges in Hong Kong
Bridges completed in 1999
Kwai Chung
1999 establishments in Hong Kong